The Katharine Gibbs School in Melville, New York, offers specialized associate and bachelor degrees and certificates to post-secondary students. Katharine Gibbs schools, founded in 1911, are for-profit institutions. In 2004, Gibbs – Melville announced a new game and web design degree. The Community College Week magazine recognized Gibbs – Melville's Criminal Justice program in their report on the nation's “Top 100 Associate Degree Producers” in July 2007.

Programs
Associate of Occupational Studies (designed to be 18 months)
Business Administration (Specializations in Accounting or Marketing)
Game and Web Design

Bachelor’s of Applied Science (designed to be 24 months)
Computer Science 
Pre-Law
Graphic Design
Business Management
Health Care Administration

Associate of Applied Science (designed to be 18 months)
Computer Network Operations
Criminal Justice
Graphic Design
Health Care Management: Long Term Care

Certificate Programs 
Computer Technical Support (designed to be 9 months)

Admissions
Admission requirements include a high school diploma or equivalent, an application, application fee, signing an enrollment agreement, and a personal interview. Financial aid is available for those who qualify.

Campus
The campus is located at 320 South Service Road, Melville, New York. Campus is open from 8:00am to 10:50pm Monday through Friday, and 8:00am to 4:00pm on Saturday.

Transition to Sanford Brown Institute
Since December 8, 2008, the Katharine Gibbs School campus is Sanford-Brown Institute.

Accreditation
Katharine Gibbs School – Melville is accredited by the Accrediting Council for Independent Colleges and Schools (ACICS) to award certificates and associate degrees.

It is authorized by the Board of Regents of the University of the State of New York to confer the Associate in Applied Science, the Associate in Occupational Studies, and certificate programs.

References

External links
 Katharine Gibbs College – Melville
 Map of Katharine Gibbs School – Melville

For-profit universities and colleges in the United States
Private universities and colleges in New York (state)
Educational institutions established in 1911
Universities and colleges in Suffolk County, New York
1911 establishments in New York (state)